Gittin is a tractate of the Mishnah and the Talmud, and is part of the order of Nashim. The content of the tractate primarily deals with the legal provisions related to halakhic divorce, in particular, the laws relating to the Get (divorce document), although the tractate contains a number of other social provisions which are only vaguely related to that subject, but which offer numerous historical references related to the time of the Jewish uprising. The laws of the divorce itself, including when a divorce is permitted or even required, are discussed in other tractates, namely Ketubot.

The word get is thought to be an Akkadian word and generally refers to a written document.

See also

 Get (divorce document)

References

External links
 Mishnah Gittin text in Hebrew
 Full Hebrew and English text of the Mishnah for tractate Gittin on Sefaria
Full Hebrew and English text of the Talmud Bavli for tractate Gittin on Sefaria
Full Hebrew text of the Talmud Yerushalmi for tractate Gittin on Sefaria
Full Hebrew text of the Tosefta for tractate Gittin on Sefaria

Mishnah
Divorce in Judaism